Mirdha (kapu)
The Mirdha (Kapu) people are an Indian Others backward classes (OBC) group that live mostly in the state of Tamilnadu , Andra Pradesh , karnatak, Odisha, Rajasthan. The 1981 census recorded a population of 28,177, mainly spread over the districts of Sambalpur, Bolangir and Kalahandi. They are considered to be the other backward classes offshoots of several other backward classes groups.

References

 Sachchinanda and RR Prasad: Encyclopaedic profile of Indian others backward classes, Discovery Publishing House, New Delhi, 1996, Page 691

Social groups of Odisha
Scheduled Tribes of Odisha